"Influence" is a song recorded by Swedish singer-songwriter Tove Lo featuring guest vocals by American rapper Wiz Khalifa. It was released on 9 September 2016 as a promotional single from her second studio album Lady Wood (2016).

Music video
The music video for "Influence" is a part of the short film Fairy Dust, which was directed by Tim Erem and premiered on 30 October 2016 via Lo's Vevo channel.

Critical reception
Alim Kheraj of DIY said that the song "sees Tove Lo appropriating the masculine role of the [fuckboi]." Entertainment Weeklys Madison Vain said that the singer "admits to being an unreliable narrator on one of the album's most irresistible tracks [...] before throwing the song to Wiz Khalifa for one of his fieriest verses yet." Writing for NME, Nick Levine noted that "she sings about hooking up and getting hard on [Lady Wood]", The Observers Kitty Empire commented "there's actually rather little scarcity value in catchy tunes in [Influence]". Sal Cinquemani of Slant Magazine said that the song is "embodied by the substance-induced euphoria of [Influence]".

Track listing
TM88 – Taylor Gang Remix
"Influence" (TM88 – Taylor Gang Remix) (featuring Wiz Khalifa) – 4:27

Credits and personnel
Credits adapted from Tidal.
 Tove Lo − vocals, songwriter
 Wiz Khalifa − vocals, songwriter
 Ludvig Söderberg − songwriter
 Jakob Jerlström − songwriter
 The Struts − producer, programmer
 Tom Coyne − mastering engineer
 John Hanes − mixing engineer
 Serban Ghenea − mixer

Charts

References

2016 songs
Island Records singles
Songs about drugs
Songs written by Tove Lo
Songs written by Ludvig Söderberg
Tove Lo songs
Wiz Khalifa songs
Songs written by Jakob Jerlström
Songs written by Wiz Khalifa